Chills is an upcoming television show and paranormal investigation team based in Brighton, UK. The main team consists of a spiritual medium, a research historian and a technological consultant, presented by Curtis Diamond. The show is directed by the producer Jon Lovell. Originating in the south coast of England, the team built a solid reputation for paranormal investigation through their unconventional format which involves cross-checking all claims made by the psychic medium against proven historical fact. The show is awaiting official commission from a number of channels. On 1 October 2011, it was leaked that post production on the first pilot episode had finished.

Conception
David Gibson is a psychic medium, becoming widely renowned across the country over a 10-year period. He built a fearsome live reputation, performing many stage shows as well as in a private capacity. He wanted to expand spiritualism's popularity and further it into the public consciousness.

The team of Chills was formed for verifiability; Gibson realised that the supernatural events which are claimed to occur at area around the country could be investigated further, so he drafted in his long-time friend Curtis Diamond to help him conceptualise the show. The historian Daniel Harrison offered to assist with researching the locations that Gibson wanted to travel to, and to verify or falsify the claims that he made. Soon after, it was decided that branching into television would be an excellent outlet for the work they were doing. Technical consultant Alessandro La Peruta completed the team, and Chills was formed.

Production
The television show began filming in the early part of 2011. Filming on the pilot concluded in September 2011, and post production was completed shortly afterward. The director Jon Lovell is the head of post production, whilst Harrison and Diamond also have a fair amount of influence in the final edit.

The show is divided between studio pieces and on-location shots. The studio pieces mainly feature the team's accounts of a location, with the exception of Harrison, who will often use the time to go into more detail about the history of the area.

The on-location shoots are often done in a single visit (this is mostly due to La Peruta's refusal to return to the area). The team often work with a skeleton crew whilst on set, with one cameraman and the director there also. The photography is performed with handheld cameras and simple tripod mounts, as the team often has to move from one place to another very quickly.

The team
Chills is composed of a presenter, psychic medium, historian, main technology consultant and a backstage team of researchers and technicians, who work behind the scenes, mainly with Harrison and La Peruta.

Curtis Diamond, the co-founder of Chills, is the team host. His primary role is to ensure the on-site investigation goes smoothly. His job is one of synthesis, providing a summary of Gibson's finding, confirming historical credibility with Harrison, and relaying information to La Peruta so that he understands the progress of the investigation.

Behind the scenes, Diamond works as an intermediary between Chills and the various people involved. He works closely with the producers of the show to source the locations that Chills investigates. His warm and friendly sense of humour is the backbone of the team.

Gibson is their psychic medium. Ten years of experience in developing himself into one of the foremost psychics in the country has led him to form Chills. His primary motivation behind this decision was a desire for spiritualism to be brought to a wider audience.

Harrison is the show's resident historian. He heads up a trained research team who intensively examine all aspects of the location selected by Chills. The full history, significant people involved and history of surrounding areas are researched thoroughly using all available historical sources. Harrison then approaches the location fully versed in its history, then provides historical context to anything Gibson encounters. As Harrison's knowledge would influence anything Gibson were to say on location, the two are kept separate before the shoot, as are Harrison's research team.

Harrison's research specialities lie in British history from 1750 onwards, specifically the socio-cultural significance of objects during the time of the British Empire. The team often relies on his calm demeanor in the field, as well as his ability to perform fast and accurate object-based analyses, which reveal the nature and purpose of objects and surroundings, which are otherwise long forgotten.

Alessandro La Peruta, known affectionately amongst the team as "Mr Gadget", works as the technology consultant. He works extensively with the backstage crew setting up various paranormal detection equipment as well as surveying the area in case the team need to exit. He uses a number of tools and techniques to provide a technological insight into what Gibson is saying. He is easily the most affected member when the team encounter disturbing occurrences. He often protests against continuing the investigation of various areas, particularly clashing with Curtis who insists upon continuing the shoot.

Format
The TV show runs in half-hour slots. The first is likely to be the team's investigation in Clapham Wood. Teaser clips released on YouTube as well as the team's official website show Gibson in full effect as a medium, and also the team apparently being harassed by spiritual activity.

On 17 September 2011, clips from a shoot at Binsted Wood were uploaded by Chills' official YouTube channel. They show La Peruta struggling to find the rest of the team and inadvertently scaring them in the process. All members of the crew, including Diamond, were visibly disturbed and wanted to leave.

External links
  
 Chillsworldwide on Twitter 
 Chills-wwwchillsproductionscom on Facebook
 

Paranormal television
British documentary television series